Lourdes Castrillo-Brillantes is a Filipina writer in the Spanish language, professor, and a Premio Zobel awardee in 1998. She has authored works such as 81 Años del Premio Zobel (81 Years of the Premio Zobel), which documented the history of the Premio Zobel and its winners; and the Tesoro Literario de Filipinas, a compilation of Filipino short stories written in the 20th century. She was also a European Languages professor at the University of the Philippines and a contributor to the Cronica of the Manila Chronicle.

Works
"81 Years of Premio Zobel: A Legacy of Filipino Literature in the Spanish Language" (2006) 
 "Tesorio Literario de Filipinas" (2009)

See also
Fernando María Guerrero
José Rizal

References

External links
Lonely Planet's Guide to the Philippines: Philippine Languages, Lonely Planet and Travel.AOL.com, retrieved on: 10 June 2007
 Direcciones hispanofilipinas/ Filipino-Spanish links: Philippine Spanish, Geocities.com, retrieved on: 10 June 2007
Philippine Spanish (PASSWORD required), Staff.NCL.ac.uk, retrieved on: 10 June 2007
 Gómez Rivera, Guillermo. Spanish in the Philippines (Language: Spanish), El idioma español en las Filipinas, Las Islas Cuentan Hoy Con Medio Millon de Hispanohablantes, La Academia Filipina, ElCastellano.org, retrieved on: 10 June 2007 
Farolan, Edmundo (Director).  Philippine Spanish, Philippine Poetry, La revista, Tomo 1 Número 7, Julio 1997 and AOL.com, retrieved on: 10 June 2007
Fernández, Tony P. Philippine Spanish, La Literatura Española en Filipinas, La Guirnalda Polar - Neoclassic E-Press and VCN.BC.ca, May 4, 1997, retrieved on: 10 June 2007
Spanish in the Philippines, Fernandez, Tony P.  The History of the Zobel Prize (La Historia del Premio Zobel): Lourdes Castrillo Brillantes, Unided en la diversidad, Internet Portal on the Spanish Language, Opinion Page (a Spanish language website), 14 November 2001, retrieved on: 10 June 2007
Philippine Spanish, Adarna.com, retrieved on: 10 June 2007
Real Academia Española, Diccionario de la lengua espanola (Spanish Dictionary), vigesima segunda edicion, RAE.es retrieved on: 10 June 2007
Spanish in the Philippines, The Situation of Spanish in the Philippines Today and Other Hispano-Filipino Articles, FilipinoKastila.Tripod.com, retrieved on: 10 June 2007

Filipino Hispanists
Living people
21st-century Filipino women writers
21st-century Filipino writers
Year of birth missing (living people)
Academic staff of the University of the Philippines
Filipino women anthropologists